Noel Ahipeaud is the Chargé d'affaires of the Permanent Mission of Côte d'Ivoire to the United Nations. In 2006, he was Côte d'Ivoire's ambassador to Mali.

References

Ivorian diplomats
Year of birth missing (living people)
Living people
Ambassadors of Ivory Coast to Mali
Place of birth missing (living people)
21st-century Ivorian politicians